Gigant is the word for giant in a number of languages. It is derived from the Greek mythological giants, the gigantes.

It may also refer to:
Gigant, nickname of Messerschmitt Me 323, a German transport aircraft
Gigant, nickname of Messerschmitt Me 321, a German transport glider, predecessor of the Me 323 above
Gigant, nickname of Hungarian MÁV Class V63 series of trains
FC Gigant Belene, an association football club based in Belene, Bulgaria
FC Gigant Grozny, a defunct association football club based in Grozny, Russia
FC Gigant Voskresensk, a defunct association football club based in Voskresensk, Russia
Gigant (rural locality), several rural localities in Russia
Gigant, a large missile launcher in the Japanese Kamen Rider Agito tokusatsu series
Gigant, a Japanese manga series written by Hiroya Oku
Muisky Gigant, a mountain in Buryatia

See also
Flettner Gigant, an experimental German helicopter
Gigant Neo (b. 1998), a Swedish breeding stallion
Gigantism